Huangzhou District is an urban district of Huanggang, Hubei province, China.

History

In 845 BC Marquis Wen 文侯 Huang Meng 黃孟 (aka Huang Zhang 黃璋) moved the capital of the State of Huang from Yicheng to Huangchuan (present-day Huangchuan, Henan). Huang Xi's descendants ruled State of Huang until 648 BC when it was destroyed by the State of Chu. The Marquis of Huang, Marquis Mu 穆侯 Huang Qisheng 黃企生, fled to the state of Qi. The people of Huang were forced to relocate to Chu. They settled in the region of present-day Hubei province, in a region known as the Jiangxia Prefecture 江夏郡 during the Han dynasty (206 BC-AD 220). There are many places in this region today that were named after Huang e.g. Huanggang, Huangpi, Huangmei, Huangshi, Huang'an (now Hong'an), Huangzhou etc. A large number of the people of Huang were also relocated to regions south of the Yangtze River.

Huangzhou was previously a separate city which administered a prefecture in its own right. Huanggang Middle School and the campuses of Huanggang Normal University are located in Huangzhou.

Geography

Administrative Divisions
Huangzhou District administers:

References

Huanggang
County-level divisions of Hubei